Igor Yakovlevich Krutoy or Ihor Yakovych Krutyi (born on July 29, 1954), is a Ukrainian and Russian music composer, performer, producer and musical promoter.
Krutoy was awarded the Lenin Komsomol Prize in 1989. He is also "Honoured Artist of the Russian Federation", People's Artist of Russia and People's Artist of Ukraine.

As a composer, he has collaborated with numerous renowned singers in classical and contemporary music, such as Anna Netrebko, Dmitri Hvorostovsky, Aida Garifullina, Andrea Bocelli, Dimash Kudaibergen, Lara Fabian, Alla Pugacheva, Ani Lorak, Rose Sisters, Mikhail Shufutinsky and Irina Allegrova.

Life and career

Igor Krutoy was born on July 29, 1954, in Haivoron (Kirovograd Oblast). When a child, he taught himself to play the accordion, and later played in the school band. Igor studied at the musical school, and after graduation he entered the Theory faculty at Kirovograd music college, where he graduated with distinction in 1974. He failed to enter the Kiev Conservatory and spent the following year giving accordion classes in Haivoron and Bandurovo village. Next year Igor entered Nikolaev State Pedagogical Institute at conductor (choral music) department. While studying there, he worked in restaurants, where he met singer Aleksander Serov, who later would become his friend and perform many of his songs. During that period Krutoy also worked as artistic director of Valentina Tolkunova band and gave performances accompanying famous Russian actor Yevgeny Leonov.
In 1979, he was invited to Moscow Concert Orchestra "Panorama", where he worked together with such famous artists, as Leonid. In 1986 Igor Krutoy finally managed to enter the Saratov Conservatory, the composer department. In parallel, his friend, popular singer Aleksander Serov, was winning international competitions with Igor Krutoy songs "Inspiration" and "In Fate's Despite".

In 2012, Igor Krutoy became the chairman of Music1.ru and a shareholder of Net Element following a $2 million investment into the company. The joint venture culminated with the launch of www.Music1.ru, expected to become the online centerpiece of Krutoy's music enterprise and the online music market leader in the Commonwealth of Independent States (CIS) countries.

Family
Igor Krutoy's father Yakov Krutoy (1917–1980) is Jewish. He worked as a freight forwarder at "RADIODETAL" factory in Haivoron. His mother Svetlana (born 1934) worked as laboratory specialist at sanitary and epidemiological station. His sister Alla Krutaya (married name Baratta), is the author and host of Laskavo prosymo (Welcome, "Ласкаво просимо") show at TV company "Ukraine". Alla has been living in the United States since 1993, she is married to Italian lawyer Anthony Baratta, and they have one daughter, Natasha, who is a student.

Private life

 first spouse – Yelena Krutaya (born in Saint Petersburg)
son Nikolai Krutoy (born 1981)
 second spouse – Olga Krutaya (born 1963), since 1995. Olga Krutaya lives in New Jersey , United States, and is running a business there. Igor and Olga have one daughter together: 
 Aleksandra (born 2003).
 step daughter Victoriya (born 1985), she is a singer, graduated from high school in New Jersey

Composer 
 When i close my eyes (Когда я закрываю глаза)
 A Sad Angel  (Печальный Ангел)
 You are in my September (Ты в моем Сентябре)
 Blue Planet (Голубая планета)

Film soundtracks
 The Snow Queen (Снежная королева, 2003)
 Hostages of "The Devil" (Заложники «Дьявола», 1993)
 Thirst for Passion (Жажда страсти, 1991)
 Souvenir for the prosecutor (Сувенир для прокурора, 1989)

Producer 
 TV series "Star Factory" (Фабрика звезд) (2002–2007)

ARS records 
Krutoy is head of ARS owns 25% of Muz-TV which plays Russian pop music videos. Since 2002, ARS also organizes the New Wave (competition) for young performers of popular music with Raimonds Pauls and Alla Pugacheva. As a management agency, ARS has signed artists such as Sopho Khalvashi.

Recordings 
 Album Madonna with Aleksander Serov, 1988.
 Album Ya plachu with Aleksander Serov, 1991.
 Album How Is It in Russia? with Rose Sisters, 1992.
 Album Ya Tuchi Razvedu Rukami with Irina Allegrova, 1996.
 Album Nezakonchenniy Roman with Irina Allegrova 1998.
 Album Odnazhdy v Amerike with Mikhail Shufutinsky, 1998.
 Album Latinsky kvartal with Laima Vaikule, 1998.
 Album Ti Eto Ya with Rose Sisters, 1998.
 Album The Rope Dancer with Valery Leontiev, 1999.
 Deja Vu, 2 CD+DVD with Dmitri Hvorostovsky, 2009.
 Album Mademoiselle Zhivago with Lara Fabian, 2010.
 Album Le Luce with Sumi Jo, 2012

Titles and honors
Honoured Art Worker of Russian Federation (1992)
People's Artist of Russia (1996)
People's Artist of Ukraine(2011)
Lenin Komsomol Prize (1989)
Order of Friendship (August 27, 2004)
Order of Merit for the Fatherland of the 4th class (July 28, 2009)
Order of Merit for the Fatherland of the 3rd class (July 21, 2014)
Order of Friendship (Kazakhstan) of the 2nd class (July 3, 2019)

References

External links
 Official website
 

1954 births
Living people
Russian composers
Russian male composers
Russian pop musicians
Russian male singers
Russian record producers
Entertainment industry businesspeople
Saratov Conservatory alumni
Fabrika Zvyozd
People's Artists of Russia
Recipients of the title of People's Artists of Ukraine
Recipients of the Lenin Komsomol Prize
Ukrainian Jews
Jewish composers
Jewish singers
People from Kirovohrad Oblast
Russian National Music Award winners